The canton of Agen-2 is an administrative division of the Lot-et-Garonne department, southwestern France. It was created at the French canton reorganisation which came into effect in March 2015. Its seat is in Agen.

It consists of the following communes:
Agen (partly)
Boé
Bon-Encontre

References

Cantons of Lot-et-Garonne